W v Registrar of Marriages [2013] HKCFA 39; FACV 4/2012 is a landmark court case for LGBT rights in Hong Kong. In a 4:1 decision, the Court of Final Appeal gave transgender people the right to marry as their affirmed gender rather than their assigned gender (referred to in the decision as 'biological sex') at birth.

Background
The applicant of the case was only identified as W and assigned male at birth. However, W was subsequently diagnosed with gender dysphoria. W started receiving medical treatments since 2005. After having successfully undergone sex reassignment surgery in 2008, she was issued with a new identity card and a passport reflecting her sex as female. In November 2008, W hired a lawyer to confirm with the Registry of Marriages whether or not she could marry her boyfriend. W was denied.

The Registrar denied W to marry her boyfriend because her assigned sex was recorded as male on her birth certificate. Hong Kong does not allow same sex marriage. The Government contended it only accepted one's sex as originally assigned on the birth certificate for marriages purposes, regardless of one's current identity card or passport.

Subsequently, W believed the Registrar's refusal had violated her constitutional right to marry as well as her right to privacy and brought the case to court for judicial review. In the Court of First Instance, Justice Andrew Cheung (as Cheung PJ then was) upheld the Registrar's decision, and the Court of Appeal dismissed an appeal; thus W appealed her case to the Court of Final Appeal. On 13 May 2013, the Court of Final Appeal overturned the Register's decision and held that W could marry her boyfriend. The Court of Final Appeal, however, issued a stay to put the decision of letting W to marry her boyfriend on hold for a year to allow time for the Government to amend the law.

(Court of Final Appeal judgment paragraphs 2, 19, 20, 58, 60)

Important facts 
The Court of Final Appeal observed the following facts.
Transsexualism (gender identity disorder and gender dysphoria) is a medical condition identified by the Hong Kong government as well as WHO under ICD-10. 
In the medical field, one's sexual identity consists of a list of both biological and psychological identity
The only accepted therapy for transsexualism involves a series of hormonal treatments as well as sex reassignment surgery. 
Sex reassignment surgery is irreversible, publicly funded, and managed by the Hospital Authority. 
The Hospital Authority will issue a 'sex changed certificate' after sex reassignment surgery. 
The Immigration Department will issue a new identity card and a passport to individuals with 'sex changed certificates' issued by the Hospital Authority or by overseas government agencies.

(Court of Final Appeal judgement paragraphs 5, 6, 11, 14-17)

Major issues
The Court of Final Appeal was presented with two issues to solve in the case:

Issue 1
Has the Registrar for Marriages misunderstood the Marriage Ordinance in coming to the conclusion precluding Ms W from marrying her male partner?

Issue 2
If the Registrar was correct, is the Marriage Ordinance as it is understood compatible with the right to marry or to privacy guaranteed by the Basic Law and the Bill of Rights Ordinance?

(Court of Final Appeal judgement paragraph 4)

Related statues and precedent cases

Arguments and reasoning

Issue 1
The following table lists out the government's arguments to demonstrate that the Registrar did not misunderstand the meaning of the words ‘woman’ and ‘female’ in the two Ordinances as well as the Court's reasoning related to each argument.

Issue 2
In the attempt to resolve Issue 2 of whether the Registrar's understanding of the Ordinances had been unconstitutional as infringing the rights to marry and to privacy, the Court broke down the analysis as in the following table and so found them unconstitutional.

Holding
Issue 1
The Court of Final Appeal held that the Registrar had been correct in construing the Ordinances using Corbett’s definition of a person’s sex.

(judgement paragraph 117)

Issue 2
The Court of Final Appeal held that Corbett’s definition of one’s sex was inadequate and too restrictive to only include biological factors and resulted in unconstitutional infringement of W’s right to marry guaranteed by Article 37 of the Basic Law and by Article 19(2) of the Bill of Rights.

(judgement paragraphs 118-119)

Court's orders

Judicial remedies
The Court of Final Appeal issued the following orders:

A declaration that W is entitled to be included in the meaning of the word ‘woman’ in Section 20(1)(d) of the Matrimonial Causes Ordinance and in Section 40 of the Marriage Ordinance to marry a man.
A declaration that the meaning of the words of ‘woman’ and ‘female’ of the Matrimonial Causes Ordinance and of the Marriage Ordinance should include post-operative male-to-female transsexuals with certificates issued by medical authorities testifying their change of gender as a result of sex reassignment surgery.
A stay for a year for the two declarations going into effect.

(judgement paragraphs 120 & 150; supplementary judgement paragraph 11)

Court's suggestion for legislation
In addition to the two declarations and a stay, the Court left open the question of at which point a transsexual should be considered to successfully have the sex changed for marriage purposes as well as for other legal areas. The Court agreed that it would be particularly beneficial for enacting primary legislation to address this problem. The Court also suggested the Government to consider the UK's Gender Recognition Act 2004 in addressing this problem.

(judgement paragraphs 120, 127-146)

Significance
Transsexuals who are certified by either local or foreign medical authorities to successfully have their sex changed are entitled to marry in their acquired sex.
The right to marry and the right to found a family are two independent rights, rather than a prerequisite to one another, even they exist within the same provision of the law.
The case creates a precedent that the lack of consensus cannot be cited as a reason to deny minority's fundamental rights.

References

External links
 Hong Kong Bill of Rights Ordinance
 The Basic Law
 Section 40 of the Marriage Ordinance
 Section 20 of the Matrimonial Causes Ordinance
 Text of Judgement, Court of Final Appeal

Hong Kong case law
LGBT rights in Hong Kong
Transgender case law
2013 in Hong Kong
2013 in case law
Transgender marriage
2013 in LGBT history